Kacharu Bhau Raut was a member of the 11th Lok Sabha of India. He represented the Malegaon constituency of Maharashtra and is a member of the Bharatiya Janata Party political party.

References

India MPs 1996–1997
Living people
Marathi politicians
Bharatiya Janata Party politicians from Maharashtra
Lok Sabha members from Maharashtra
People from Malegaon
Year of birth missing (living people)